Elegies is the second live album by American heavy metal band Machine Head, recorded at the Brixton Academy in London. The concert was recorded in December 2004 and released on DVD on October 11, 2005. As well as the London concert, the DVD also features film clips and a short documentary about the making of Through the Ashes of Empires.

Track listing

References

2005 video albums
Live video albums
Machine Head (band) video albums
Roadrunner Records video albums
Albums recorded at the Brixton Academy
Roadrunner Records live albums